Anacanthus barbatus, also known as the bearded leatherjacket, is a species of filefish found in the Indo-Pacific. This species grows to a length of  TL. This species is the only known member of its genus. This species is of minor importance to local commercial fisheries.

References

Monacanthidae
Taxa named by John Edward Gray
Monotypic marine fish genera